Liberation or liberate may refer to:

Film and television
 Liberation (film series), a 1970–1971 series about the Great Patriotic War
 "Liberation" (The Flash), a TV episode
 "Liberation" (K-9), an episode

Gaming
 Liberation: Captive 2, an Amiga computer game, 1993
 Killzone: Liberation, for PlayStation Portable, 2006
 Assassin's Creed III: Liberation, 2012
 Liberated (video game), 2020

Literature
 Liberation (magazine), American pacifist magazine published 1956 to 1977
Libération, a French newspaper
 Libération (Morocco), a Moroccan newspaper
 Libération (newspaper, 1941–1964), a French newspaper 
 Liberation News, the newspaper of the Party for Socialism and Liberation
Liberation: Being the Adventures of the Slick Six After the Collapse of the United States of America, a novel by Brian Francis Slattery, 2008
Oslobođenje ('Liberation'), a Bosnian newspaper

Music

Albums
 Liberation (1349 album), 2003 
 Liberation (Bunny Wailer album), 1989
 Liberation (Christina Aguilera album), 2018 
 Liberation (The Divine Comedy album), 1993
 Liberation (Mýa album), 2007 
 Liberation (Talib Kweli and Madlib album), 2007 
 Liberation: Songs to Benefit PETA, by various artists, 2003
 Liberation (EP), by Devils in Heaven, 1993
 Libération (album), by Les Rythmes Digitales, 1996
 Liberation, by Gravity Noir, 2017
 Liberation, by Ice Age, 2001
 Liberation, by Jackie-O Motherfucker, 2001
 Liberation, by Karsh Kale, 2003
 Liberation, by Trans Am, 2004
 The Liberation (album), by Disillusion, 2019

Songs
 "Liberation" (Pet Shop Boys song), 1994
 "Liberation" (Lippy Lou song), 1995
 "Liberation", by Bunny Wailer from Liberation, 1989
 "Liberation", by Devin Townsend from Epicloud, 2012
 "Liberation", by Earth, Wind & Fire from Illumination, 2005
 "Liberation", by Hardcore Superstar from Bad Sneakers and a Piña Colada, 2000
 "Liberation", by In Flames from Sounds of a Playground Fading, 2011
 "Liberation", by Katatonia from Night Is the New Day, 2009
 "Liberation" (1999) and "Liberation (Fly Like An Angel)" (2001), by Matt Darey
 "Liberation", by Mike Oldfield from The Millennium Bell, 1999
 "Liberation", by Muse from Will of the People, 2022
 "Liberation", by Outkast featuring Cee-Lo on Aquemini, 1998
 "Liberation", by Village People from Can't Stop the Music, 1980
 "Liberation", by Vision of Disorder from Vision of Disorder, 1996
 "Liberate" (Disturbed song), 2003
 "Liberate" (Eric Prydz song), 2014
 "Liberate", by Reks from The Greatest X, 2016
 "Liberate", by Remy Shand from The Way I Feel, 2002
 "Liberate", by Slipknot from Slipknot, 1999
 "Liberate", by Superheist from Identical Remote Controlled Reactions, 2003

Concert tours
The Liberation Tour (Mary J. Blige and D'Angelo tour), 2012–2013
The Liberation Tour (Christina Aguilera tour), 2018

Record labels
Liberation Music, an Australian record label
Liberation Records, an American record company

Other uses
 Liberation (Holocaust memorial), in Jersey City, U.S.
 Liberation (painting), by Odd Nerdrum, 1974
 Liberation (pharmacology), when medication enters the body
 Liberation fonts, four TrueType fonts

See also
 
 Liberalization, making laws, systems, or opinions less severe
 Liberationist (disambiguation)
 Liberator (disambiguation)
 Libration, in lunar astronomy
 Liberation psychology
 Emancipation, to procure economic and social rights, political rights or equality 
 Enlightenment (spiritual)
 Jiefang (disambiguation) (Chinese, 'liberation')
 Liberation of France, in the Second World War
 Liberation theology, a Christian theological approach 
 Moksha, a term in Indian religions
 National Liberation Movement (disambiguation)
 Nirvana, a religious concept
 Revolution (disambiguation)
 Sexual revolution, or Sexual liberation
 Tahrir (disambiguation) (Arabic, 'liberation')
 Wars of national liberation
 Women's liberation movement